Helen Mary Laird PhD OBE, DL (14 April 1931 – 18 April 2020) was an electron-microscopist working laterally in the Veterinary Faculty Pathology Department at the University of Glasgow.  She worked as part of a research team studying cancer, and particularly viruses in spontaneous feline leukaemia. She served on various committees of the Royal Microscopical Society.

Helen was a pupil at St Columba’s School, Kilmacolm and continued to be involved in the school throughout her life, serving on the Board of Governors.

Helen was heavily involved in the Girl Guide movement, holding a number of positions in Scotland, UK and internationally.  In 1960 she spent a six-month career break in Ghana training adult leaders on behalf of the World Association of Girl Guides and Girl Scouts (WAGGGS). In 1975 she was elected to the Board of WAGGGS and served as Chairperson to this board from 1981-84.

In recognition of her contribution to Guiding, she received many national and international Guiding and Scouting awards including the 180th Bronze Wolf, Silver Fish and Juliette Gordon Low medals.  Helen was appointed OBE in 1985 for services to Girl Guiding.

In 1987, she was commissioned as a Deputy Lieutenant of the Lieutenancy of Renfrewshire, becoming one of the very few women so appointed at that time in Scotland.

References

External links

Recipients of the Bronze Wolf Award
1931 births
2020 deaths
People educated at St Columba's School, Kilmacolm
Officers of the Order of the British Empire
Scouting and Guiding in the United Kingdom